The Morans Falls, a plunge waterfall on Morans Creek, is located in the UNESCO World Heritagelisted Gondwana Rainforests in the South East region of Queensland, Australia.

Location and features
The waterfall is situated within Lamington National Park in the Green Mountains, part of the Shield Volcano Group in the Scenic Rim of the Gondwana Rainforests and can be accessed via the Morans Falls Track, a  return walking track.

See also

 List of waterfalls of Queensland

References

External links

Waterfalls of Queensland
Geography of South East Queensland
Gondwana Rainforests of Australia
Great Dividing Range